Rachid Tiberkanine (born 28 March 1985) is a professional footballer who plays for Al Kharaitiyat as a midfielder and forward. Born in Belgium, he represented Morocco at international level.

Early and personal life
Born in Antwerp, Belgium, Tiberkanine holds dual Belgian-Moroccan nationality.

Club career
Tiberkanine spent his early career with Liège and Germinal Beerschot. He signed a professional contract with Dutch club Ajax  in 2004, but never made a first-team appearance. He moved to German club Bayer Leverkusen in June 2006. After playing for their second team, he moved to Russian club FC Moscow, who in turn loaned him to Latvian club FC Daugava. He next moved to Bulgarian club Levski Sofia, and later played for Emirati club Dubai Club and Moroccan club Olympique de Khouribga. He signed for FUS in July 2016. He joined Qatari club Al Kharaitiyat on loan in 2017. He joined Qatari club Al-Sailiya in 2018. He joined Qatari club Al Kharaitiyat in 2019.

International career
After playing youth football for Belgium, he later declared his international allegiance to Morocco.

References

External links
NFT Profile

1985 births
Living people
Footballers from Antwerp
Moroccan footballers
Morocco international footballers
Morocco youth international footballers
Belgian footballers
Belgium youth international footballers
Belgian sportspeople of Moroccan descent
RFC Liège players
Beerschot A.C. players
AFC Ajax players
Bayer 04 Leverkusen II players
FC Moscow players
FC Daugava players
PFC Levski Sofia players
Dubai CSC players
Olympique Club de Khouribga players
Fath Union Sport players
Al Kharaitiyat SC players
Al-Sailiya SC players
First Professional Football League (Bulgaria) players
Association football midfielders
Belgian expatriate footballers
Moroccan expatriate footballers
Belgian expatriate sportspeople in the Netherlands
Moroccan expatriate sportspeople in the Netherlands
Expatriate footballers in the Netherlands
Belgian expatriate sportspeople in Germany
Moroccan expatriate sportspeople in Germany
Expatriate footballers in Germany
Belgian expatriate sportspeople in Russia
Moroccan expatriate sportspeople in Russia
Expatriate footballers in Russia
Belgian expatriate sportspeople in Latvia
Moroccan expatriate sportspeople in Latvia
Expatriate footballers in Latvia
Belgian expatriate sportspeople in Bulgaria
Moroccan expatriate sportspeople in Bulgaria
Expatriate footballers in Bulgaria
Belgian expatriate sportspeople in the United Arab Emirates
Moroccan expatriate sportspeople in the United Arab Emirates
Expatriate footballers in the United Arab Emirates
Belgian expatriate sportspeople in Qatar
Moroccan expatriate sportspeople in Qatar
Expatriate footballers in Qatar
UAE Pro League players
Qatar Stars League players
Qatari Second Division players